Emergency Medicine Clinics of North America is a medical journal that covers the aspects of anesthesia, critical care, and emergency medicine on the latest trends in patient management. The journal is published by Elsevier.

Abstracting and indexing 
The journal is abstracted and indexed in:

 Embase
 PubMed/Medline
 CINAHL
 Biological Abstracts
 Current Contents - Clinical Medicine
 Science Citation Index
 Research Alert

According to the Journal Citation Reports, the journal has a 2021 impact factor of 2.000.

References

External links 

 
Elsevier academic journals
English-language journals
Emergency medicine journals
Publications with year of establishment missing